Lycée Français de Guadalajara (CFM) is a French international school in Zapopan, Jalisco, Mexico, in Greater Guadalajara. The school serves maternelle (preschool) through lycée (senior high school).

See also

French immigration to Mexico

References

External links
  Lycée Français de Guadalajara
  Lycée Français de Guadalajara

French international schools in Mexico
International schools in the Guadalajara Metropolitan Area
Zapopan